Stuart A. Varney (born July 7, 1948) is a British-American talk show host and conservative political commentator who works for Fox News and the Fox Business Network. Born in the United Kingdom, he worked as a journalist before joining Fox News in January 2004 as a business contributor, such as on Your World with Neil Cavuto.

Early life

Varney was born in Derby, Derbyshire, England. After secondary school, Varney spent a year working in Nairobi, Kenya, before graduating from the London School of Economics.

Journalism career
After working as a reporter for Radio Hong Kong, he began his broadcast journalism career at KEMO-TV (now KOFY-TV) in San Francisco. He was then recruited to join the Manhattan bureau of the newly formed 24-hour news network CNN, which launched on June 1, 1980. He hosted the CNN shows Business Day, Business Asia, and Moneyline with Willow Bay. In 2001, he left CNN to host CNBC's "Wall Street Journal Editorial Board with Stuart Varney."

He joined Fox News's business team in January 2004, and joined Fox Business Network as an anchor when the network launched in October 2007.

Fox Business Network
Varney currently co-hosts Varney & Co. on the Fox Business Network, which airs from 9:00 a.m. to noon ET every weekday. The show is also co-hosted by Lauren Simonetti, Susan Li and Ashley Webster. He is also a regular panel member on the Fox Business program Cashin' In.

Varney has appeared on and guest-hosted "Your World with Neil Cavuto." Varney joined Fox News in 2004.

Prior to joining FNC, Varney served as the host of CNBC's "Wall Street Journal Editorial Board with Stuart Varney." Before that, he was a co-anchor of CNN's "Moneyline News Hour." Varney helped launch CNN's business news team in 1980 and hosted many of their financial programs including, "Your Money," "Business Day" and "Business Asia."

Notable commentaries
In an interview on June 5, 2013 on Fox News, Varney said "We hand down $79 billion dollars every January on these so-called poor people." "You’re not being mean to poor people?" host Gretchen Carlson asked Varney, who responded, "I am. I am being mean to poor people. Frankly, I am." This exchange of words gained brief popularity when it was cited on The Daily Show with Jon Stewart on Comedy Central, with journalists from The Washington Post reporting on his comments afterwards.

On the July 19, 2011 edition of Fox News' Your World with Neil Cavuto, Varney criticized the view that America's poor are "starving and living in squalor," citing a Heritage Foundation report on how the ownership of household appliances demonstrates how well-off America's poor really are. Varney concluded by saying, "The image we have of poor people as starving and living in squalor really is not accurate. Many of them have things; what they lack is the richness of spirit. That's my opinion."

In 2013 Varney generated controversy for his commentary on Pope Francis, who had criticized the wealth gap and denounced unfettered capitalism as a system which "rules rather than serves." Varney stated, "I go to church to save my soul. It’s got nothing to do with my vote. Pope Francis has linked the two. He has offered direct criticism of a specific political system. He has characterized, negatively, that system. I think he wants to influence my politics."

In a December 2018 interview, Republican congressman Louie Gohmert repeated a false conspiracy theory about George Soros that he "turned on fellow Jews and helped take the property that they owned." Varney did not address Gohmert's comments, moving the segment on. Varney later distanced himself from the remarks, calling them "unsubstantiated and false allegations".

On August 30, 2019, Varney claimed that President Donald Trump had never lied to the American public in conversation with Republican presidential candidate Joe Walsh on Varney & Co. This claim was countered by statistics compiled by the Washington Post's fact checker during the presidency of Donald Trump, claiming at least 8,000 falsehoods were attributed to Trump in his first two years of his presidency. Overall, Trump's false or misleading claims totalled 30,573 over his 4-year tenure as President.

Personal life
Varney has lived in the United States since 1974. In November 2015, Varney became an American citizen.

He has six children and ten grandchildren.

References

External links
 Bio on FoxBusiness.com
 
 

1949 births
Living people
American television reporters and correspondents
American political commentators
American broadcast news analysts
American Episcopalians
Alumni of the London School of Economics
English emigrants to the United States
Fox Business people
People from Derby
Hong Kong people
Writers from San Francisco
People from Franklin Lakes, New Jersey
People from Wyckoff, New Jersey
Fox News people
Naturalized citizens of the United States
21st-century American Episcopalians